The nineteenth season of Food Paradise, an American food reality television series narrated by Jess Blaze Snider on the Cooking Channel, premiered on October 27, 2019. First-run episodes of the series aired in the United States on Wednesdays at 10:00 p.m. EDT.

Food Paradise features the best places to find various cuisines at food locations across America. Each episode focuses on a certain type of restaurant, such as "Diners", "Bars", "Drive-Thrus" or "Breakfast" places that people go to find a certain food specialty.

Episodes

Ooey Gooey Greatness

All Wrapped Up

Totally Unexpected

Happy Appy Hour

Bucket List Burgers

American Eats

Best of the Midwest

Craving Comfort

Flame On!

Pizza Playoffs

Titanic Treats

Finger Lickin'

Tasty Twists

New 'Cue on the Block

At the Drive-In

Best of the Fests

Food Hall Frenzy

Tasty Taverns

Grub on the Go

Seafood–Eat Food!

Secret Menus

Sandwich Obsession

Extreme Eats

Bang For Your Buck

Off the Beaten Q

Meals Over Miami

Meaty Madness

Outdoor Eats

Neighborhood Hangouts

Guilty Pleasures

Click on the Link

Global Grub

The Brunch Bunch

Mangia Meals

Monster Mashups

References

External links
Food Paradise @Travelchannel.com

2019 American television seasons
2020 American television seasons
2021 American television seasons